The Saudi Arabia women's national basketball team represents Saudi Arabia in international competitions and friendly matches. It is managed by the Saudi Basketball Federation.

Saudi Arabia made the international headlines after it sent a team to the 2019 Special Olympics World Summer Games where its team won the gold medal.

See also 
 Saudi Arabia men's national basketball team

External links
Archived records of Saudi Arabia team participations
Saudi Basketball Federation on Instagram

References

Women's national basketball teams
Basketball in Saudi Arabia
Basketball teams in Saudi Arabia
National sports teams of Saudi Arabia